Vesela Dolyna may refer to the following places in Ukraine:

Donetsk Oblast
Vesela Dolyna, Bakhmut Raion, Donetsk Oblast, village in Bakhmut Raion
Vesela Dolyna, Horlivka Raion, Donetsk Oblast, village in Horlivka Raion

Sumy Oblast
Vesela Dolyna, Lypova Dolyna rural hromada, Romny Raion, Sumy Oblast, village in Romny Raion
Vesela Dolyna, Synivka rural hromada, Romny Raion, Sumy Oblast, village in Romny Raion

Elsewhere
Vesela Dolyna, Dnipropetrovsk Oblast, village in Kamianske Raion
Vesela Dolyna, Odessa Oblast, village in Bolhrad Raion
Vesela Dolyna, Poltava Oblast, village in Kremenchuk Raion